Mirae (Korean: 미래소년; stylized in all caps), is a South Korean boy band formed in 2021 under DSP Media. The group consists of seven members: Lien, Lee Jun-hyuk, Yoo Dou-hyun, Khael, Son Dong-pyo, Park Si-young and Jang Yu-bin. The group debuted on March 17, 2021, with the release of their first extended play (EP), Killa.

Name 
The group is named MIRAE, which means “future.” In Korean, 미래소년 means "Future Boys." The logo incorporates the Korean characters that make up the group’s name. The name of the group was inspired by their goals of pursuing a new future of K-pop, "Future Boys" means it's a name fitting for a group who will represent and lead the new future of K-Pop. The 4 consonants, ㅁㄹㅅㄴ, of their group name in korean designed in a perfect hexagon.

History

Pre-debut
Prior to the group's debut, members Son Dong-pyo and Lee Jun-hyuk participated on Produce X 101. Son Dong-pyo finished in sixth place, becoming a member of X1 until their disbandment in January 2020. Khael and Park Si-young were former contestants on Under Nineteen. 

On January 31, 2020, DSP Media announced the launch of official accounts including Twitter and V Live for their upcoming boy group DSP N.

2021: Debut with Killa and Splash
At midnight on February 1, 2021, DSP N announced through their fancafe that they would be known as MIRAE. An official logo motion video was released at the same time, along with the opening of their official SNS accounts.

On February 22, DSP Media announced the group were set to debut.  On February 2, Park Si Young was introduced as the group's first member, followed by Lee Jun Hyuk on the 3rd, Lien on the 4th, Son Dong Pyo on the 5th, Jang Yu Bin on the 6th, Khael on the 7th and Yoo Do Hyun on the 8th. A group profile film was released on the 9th. 

On March 17, they released their first extended play Killa.

The following day the group made their debut stage on Mnet's M Countdown. Their debut music video gained more than 10 million views, and the EP sold more than 26,000 copies within the first week of the group's debut, earning them the moniker "2021 Super Rookies".

On August 25, they released their second extended play Splash.

2022: Marvelous, Ourturn
On January 12, they released their third extended play Marvelous.

On September 28, they released their fourth extended play Ourturn.

Members
Adapted from their Naver profile and website profile.
 
 Lee Junhyuk- leader
 Lien
 Yoo Dohyun
 Khael
 Son Dongpyo 
 Park Siyoung
 Jang Yubin

Discography

Extended plays

Singles

Videography

Music videos

Filmography

Reality shows

Awards and nominations

References

External links
  

 
DSP Media artists
2021 establishments in South Korea
Musical groups from Seoul
K-pop music groups
Musical groups established in 2021
South Korean dance music groups
South Korean boy bands